The 1951 Úrvalsdeild was the 40th season of the highest association football league in Iceland.

Overview
It was contested by 5 teams, and ÍA won the championship. ÍA's Ríkharður Jónsson was the top scorer with 7 goals.

League standings

Results

References

Úrvalsdeild karla (football) seasons
Iceland
Iceland
Urvalsdeild